Psudorucentra is a genus of beetles in the family Cerambycidae, containing the following species:

 Psudorucentra elongata Breuning, 1948
 Psudorucentra sybroides Breuning, 1948

References

Apomecynini